Deeside RFC is a rugby union club based in Banchory, Scotland.

History

The club began as Aboyne RFC; but they moved to Banchory in 2011, when 4 new rugby pitches were built. The Deeside name was then adopted to reflect the new catchment area.

The club installed new floodlights in 2014.

The club became a registered charity in February 2017. They have the Scottish Charity Number: SCO47171.

It applied to the council to build a clubhouse in 2019.

Sides

The club takes in Primary 1 to adults, and has around 500 players attending in all ages, male and female.

Sevens tournament

The club runs the Deeside Sevens. It is one leg of the 'Kings of the North' tournament.

Honours

Mens

 Banff Sevens
 Champions (1): 2019
 Garioch Sevens 
 Champions (1): 1994 (when as Aboyne RFC)

References

Rugby union in Aberdeenshire
Scottish rugby union teams